Kush generally refers to a pure or hybrid Cannabis indica strain. Pure C. indica strains include Afghan Kush, Hindu Kush, Green Kush, and Purple Kush. Hybrid strains of C. indica include Blueberry Kush and Golden Jamaican Kush. The term "kush" is now also used as a slang word for cannabis.

The origins of Kush Cannabis are from landrace plants mainly in Afghanistan, Northern Pakistan and North-Western India with the name coming from the Hindu Kush  mountain range. "Hindu Kush" strains of Cannabis were taken to the United States in the mid-to-late 1970s and continue to be available there to the present day.

Popular kush strains include OG Kush, Bubba Kush, and Purple Kush.

See also
Medical cannabis

References

Cannabis strains
Cannabis in Afghanistan
Cannabis in Pakistan